Lakona may refer to:
Lakon or Lakona, a language spoken on Gaua island in Vanuatu
Lakona Bay, a bay on the western coast of Gaua island in Vanuatu (where Lakon is spoken)
Lakona of Oahu, a king
Laakona or Lakona, Prince of Oahu, brother of Nuakea